The 2015 Temple Owls football team represented Temple University in the 2015 NCAA Division I FBS football season. The Owls were led by third-year head coach Matt Rhule and played their home games at Lincoln Financial Field. They were members of the East Division of the American Athletic Conference. They finished the season 10–4, 7–1 in American Athletic play to finish as champions of the East Division. They represented the East Division in the American Athletic Championship Game where they lost to Houston. They were invited to the Boca Raton Bowl where they lost to Toledo.

The season was highlighted by the first win against Penn State since 1941, their first ever 7–0 start, and their first AP Poll and Coaches Poll ranking since 1979, and is widely considered the greatest season in program history.

Schedule

Schedule Source:

Game summaries

Penn State

This was the Owls' first victory over Penn State since 1941. The announced crowd at Lincoln Financial Field was 69,176 Saturday, a record for a Temple home game. After the Nittany Lions scored 10 points in the first quarter, Temple responded with 27 unanswered points. Penn State quarterback Christian Hackenberg was sacked 10 times, with Temple linebacker Tyler Matakevich recording three sacks. This game was Temple's first victory over a Big Ten team since a 1990 victory over the Wisconsin Badgers, as the Owls snapped a 31-game losing streak in the series to the Nittany Lions.

at Cincinnati

This was the Owls' first victory over Cincinnati since 1985.

at UMass

at Charlotte

Tulane

UCF

at East Carolina

This was the first game, and win, for a nationally ranked Owls team since 1979.

Notre Dame

This was the first time ESPN's College GameDay visited a Temple home game. Set up at Independence Mall, the broadcast attracted more than 10,000 fans.

at SMU

at South Florida

Memphis

UConn

This win sealed the Owl's berth in the inaugural AAC Championship, their second division title in team history.

The American Championship vs. Houston

Boca Raton Bowl vs. Toledo

Awards and honors

National Awards
Defense
Tyler Matakevich - LB - Senior 
Chuck Bednarik Award - Winner
Bronko Nagurski Trophy - Winner
Lott IMPACT Trophy - Finalist
Lombardi Award - Semi-Finalist

All Americans
Consensus All-American
Tyler Matakevich - LB - Senior
Phil Steele All American Team
Dion Dawkins - OL - Junior - 4th Team

Conference Awards
Defense
Tyler Matakevich - LB - Senior
American Athletic Conference Defensive Player of the Year - Winner

American Athletic Conference All-Conference Team

First Team
Kyle Friend, C
Matt Ioannidis, DL
Eric Lofton, OL
Tyler Matakevich, LB
Nate D. Smith, DL
Jahad Thomas, RB
Alex Wells, FS

Second Team
Dion Dawkins, OL
Sean Chandler, DB

Honorable Mention
Haason Reddick, DL

Rankings

NFL Players

NFL Draft Combine

Three Temple players were invited to participate in the 2016 NFL Scouting Combine.

† Top performer

2016 NFL Draft

Following the season, the following members of the Temple football team were selected in the 2016 NFL Draft.

Undrafted Free Agents

In addition to the draft selections above, the following Temple players signed NFL contracts after the draft.

References

Temple
Temple Owls football seasons
Temple Owls football